Tingyuan shenshen may refer to:

Tingyuan shenshen, a 1969 Taiwanese novel by Chiung Yao
You Can't Tell Him, a 1971 Taiwanese film based on the novel
Deep Garden, a 1987 Taiwanese TV series based on the novel